Greg Cox may refer to:

 Greg Cox (American football) (born 1965), American former National Football League safety
 Greg Cox (writer) (born 1959), science fiction writer
 Greg Cox (politician) (born 1949), former mayor of Chula Vista, California
 Greg Cox (rugby league) (born 1957), Australian rugby league player